The Sarojini Nagar metro station is a station located on the Pink Line of the Delhi Metro. The station was opened on 6 August 2018.

The station

Station layout

Facilities

Entry/Exit

Connections

Bus
Delhi Transport Corporation bus routes number 536, 544, 544A, AC-544, serve the station from Sarojini Nagar Police Station bus stop.

See also

Delhi
List of Delhi Metro stations
Transport in Delhi
Delhi Metro Rail Corporation
Delhi Suburban Railway
Inner Ring Road, Delhi
Sarojini Nagar
Delhi Monorail
Delhi Transport Corporation
South Delhi
New Delhi
National Capital Region (India)
List of rapid transit systems
List of metro systems

References

External links

 Delhi Metro Rail Corporation Ltd. (Official site)
 Delhi Metro Annual Reports
 
 UrbanRail.Net – Descriptions of all metro systems in the world, each with a schematic map showing all stations.

Delhi Metro stations
Railway stations in West Delhi district